"Never Be the Same Again" is the lead single from the album Bulletproof Wallets by Ghostface Killah. The single features fellow Wu-Tang Clan member Raekwon and Carl Thomas. The single features a heavy R&B vibe, a departure from Ghost's normal output.

The song was later added to his greatest hits album Shaolin's Finest.

Lyrical & music video content
Described as a "sappy love song", "Never Be the Same Again" is a departure for Ghost's usual street-oriented output. The video shows Ghost and his girl, played by actress LisaRaye, in a courtroom with Judge Mills Lane presiding.

Track listing

A side
 Album version
 Instrumental version

B side
 Radio edit
 LP Acappella

Charts

External links
Music video

References

2001 singles
Ghostface Killah songs
2001 songs
Epic Records singles
Songs written by Ghostface Killah
Songs written by Raekwon
Raekwon songs